Delphinida is a clade of cetaceans in the parvorder Odontoceti, the toothed whales. It includes all modern oceanic dolphins, porpoises, and their relatives, such as Lipotidae and Iniidae.

References

Toothed whales